Nasser Al Hajri (born 1 October 1981) is a retired Kuwaiti footballer. He played for Al Salibikhaet.

He had six appearances for the Kuwaiti national team.

References

External links
 Player profile at goalzz.com

1981 births
Living people
Kuwaiti footballers
Kuwait international footballers
FK Borac Banja Luka players
Al Salmiya SC players
Al-Sulaibikhat SC players
Sportspeople from Kuwait City

Association football defenders
Kuwaiti expatriate sportspeople in Bosnia and Herzegovina
Al-Nasr SC (Kuwait) players
Kuwait Premier League players
Kuwaiti expatriate footballers
Premier League of Bosnia and Herzegovina players